The Global Policy Forum (GPF) is an international non-governmental organization founded in December 1993 and based in New York and Bonn (Global Policy Forum Europe).[1]  The aim of the Global Policy Forum is to critically accompany and analyze developments in the United Nations and on the topic of global governance. Thereby a bridge between the international and the local level is to be built. GPF seeks to strengthen intergovernmental organizations and promote multilateralism based on solidarity, international law and the United Nations Charter. The Global Policy Forum also has consultative status on the United Nations Economic and Social Council (ECOSOC for short). Jens Martens has been the GPF's executive director since 2014 and director of GPF Europe since its foundation in 2004.[2]  

The Global Policy Forum takes a holistic approach to its work, linking aspects of peace and security with issues of economic and social justice, human development, and sustainable policies. Its goal is to expose deep-seated power structures in the multilateral world order and in the United Nations, and to find egalitarian, cooperative, peaceful and sustainable solutions to the world's major problems. To that effect, the organization calls for increased accountability and citizen participation.

History

The Global Policy Forum was founded in New York in 1993 by a total of 14 progressive scholars and activists, including James Paul, Erskine Barton Childers, and Joel Krieger. On September 24, 2004, a European branch was established in Bonn, Germany, in order to work more closely on German and European policy in the context of the United Nations. In spring 2005, the Bonn office was opened and has since been operating under the name Global Policy Forum Europe. The two organizations are legally separate, but the teams in New York and Bonn work closely together.

Areas of work

The work programs currently focus on sustainable development and human rights, development finance and tax justice, UN reform and multilateralism, and corporate influence and accountability. The GPF thus takes a holistic approach, combining social with economic, financial and environmental issues, peace and security, and human rights and gender justice.

Publications and Events

Each year, the Global Policy Forum publishes a variety of comprehensive issue-specific reports, policy papers, shorter technical texts, and position statements on the latest developments in the respective areas of work. The English and German publications can be found on the website.[3] Many of the publications are produced in cooperation with various national and international organizations. 

For example, since 2016, the Global Policy Forum has published the annual Spotlight Report on Sustainable Development in cooperation with international non-governmental organizations from the Global South and the Global North, which analyzes the latest developments and trends in the implementation of the 2030 Agenda.[4]

In addition, the GPF organizes expert discussions, civil society conferences and other meetings, and actively participates in policy dialogue at a wide range of events

Funding

The Global Policy Forum Europe is a non-profit registered association. For the most part, the GPF is financed by grants from partner organizations, public institutions and foundations, as well as by membership fees and individual donations. Details are published here.[5]

Organization

The business of GPF is conducted by a board[6] and secretariat in New York, the business of GPF Europe by a separate board and secretariat in Bonn. The programs are closely linked and are implemented by teams in Bonn and New York respectively.[7] These teams are supported by a network of volunteer members (from GPF Europe) and consultants based in different parts of the world.

Network

GPF and GPF Europe play an active role in international civil society networks and alliances.[8] These include Social Watch, the Women's Major Group, the Reflection Group on the 2030 Agenda for Sustainable Development, the Global Alliance for Tax Justice, the Civil Society Financing for Development Group, the Treaty Alliance, the CorA Network for Corporate Responsibility, and the Geneva Global Health Hub (G2H2), among others.

Activities are also implemented in close collaboration with civil society organizations and networks. Partners include the Arab NGO Network for Development (ANND), the Center for Economic and Social Rights (CESR), Development Alternatives with Women for a New Era (DAWN), Public Services International (PSI), Society for International Development (SID), Third World Network (TWN), the Friedrich Ebert Foundation (FES), the Rosa Luxemburg Foundation (RLS), Misereor, Brot für die Welt, Engagement Global, and the Foundation Environment and Development of North Rhine-Westphalia.

Footnotes
[1] https://www.globalpolicy.org/en

[2] https://www.globalpolicy.org/en/staff/jens-martens

[3] https://www.globalpolicy.org/en/gpf/publications

[4] https://www.2030spotlight.org/en

[5] https://www.globalpolicy.org/en/support-gpf

[6] https://www.globalpolicy.org/en/board-members

[7] https://www.globalpolicy.org/en/staff

[8] https://www.globalpolicy.org/en/gpf/network

External links
 

Government watchdog groups in the United States
Global policy organizations
United Nations relations